Richard Murray "Ric" Trivett (born 2 October 1943) was a rugby union player who represented Australia.

Trivett, a centre, was born in Brisbane, Queensland and claimed a total of 2 international rugby caps for Australia. He was educated at the Anglican Church Grammar School.

References

Australian rugby union players
Australia international rugby union players
1943 births
Living people
People educated at Anglican Church Grammar School
Rugby union players from Brisbane
Rugby union centres